Armona Union Academy (AUA) is a K-12 school in Armona, California owned and operated by the Seventh-day Adventist Church. Established in 1904, AUA is the only Seventh-day Adventist high school in the surrounding area.  It is a part of the Seventh-day Adventist education system, the world's second largest Christian school system.
in Kings County, California.
The school is governed by a board composed of the pastors (ex officio) and elected members from several area Adventist Churches.

History
Armona Union Academy had its beginnings in a room in the home of a Seventh-day Adventist church member named Nis Hansen in 1904. The school was moved to its present site, on the south side of Locust Street where it intersects with 14 and 1/2 Avenue, in 1907 when Nis Hansen donated  to the Adventist church for the purpose of a church school. Eventually the local church governing body (the Central California Conference) was granted ownership of the school property, and AUA became a sister institution to the many schools that the church operates in the Central Valley, and around the world.
 
Armona Union Academy (thanks to the support of the constituent Seventh-day Adventist Churches, school Alumni, and community members) has operated continuously through many challenges including fires in 1935 and 1998. As the years passed, buildings were constructed to meet the needs, including the elementary complex, the industrial arts complex, and the gymnasium. Following the last fire, six new rooms including a new science lab were constructed to meet the needs of the high school classrooms.

Academics
The required curriculum includes classes in the following subject areas: Religion, English, Oral Communications, Social Studies, Mathematics, Science, Physical Education, Health, Computer Applications, Fine Arts, and Electives.

Spiritual aspects
All students take religion classes each year that they are enrolled. These classes cover topics in biblical history and Christian and denominational doctrines. Instructors in other disciplines also begin each class period with prayer or a short devotional thought. Once a month on a Friday, the entire student body gathers together in the auditorium for a 40 minute long chapel service.
Outside the classrooms there is year-round spiritually oriented programming that relies on student involvement.

Accreditation 
Armona Union Academy is accredited by the Accrediting Commission for Schools,  Western Association of Schools and Colleges  WASC accrediting organization.

See also

 List of Seventh-day Adventist secondary schools
 Seventh-day Adventist education

References

External links
 

Adventist secondary schools in the United States
Private elementary schools in California
Private middle schools in California
Private high schools in California